The Château de Sablé is an historic castle in Sablé-sur-Sarthe, Sarthe, Pays de la Loire, France.

History
The castle was built from 1717 to 1750 to the design of architect Claude Desgots for Jean-Baptiste Colbert, Marquess of Torcy. Its grounds are bordered by the Vaige river. By the 19th century, it belonged to the Duke of Chaulnes.

It was a chicory factory from 1919 to 1960.

It was acquired by the city of Sablé-sur-Sarthe in 1960. Since 1979, it has been home to the Centre technique de conservation Joël-le-Theule of the Bibliothèque nationale de France, named in honour of local politician Joël Le Theule.

Architectural significance
It has been listed as an official monument since 1983.

References

Châteaux in Sarthe
Monuments historiques of Pays de la Loire
Houses completed in 1750